The 1948 Progressive National Convention was held in Philadelphia from July 23–25, 1948. The convention ratified the candidacies of former Vice President Henry A. Wallace from Iowa for president and U.S. Senator Glen H. Taylor of Idaho for vice president. The Progressive Party's platform opposed the Cold War and emphasized foreign policy.

Background
Henry Wallace who formed the Progressive Party in 1948 was deemed one of the most liberal idealists in the Roosevelt administration. He was the secretary of agriculture before he served as FDR's vice president during his (1941–45) third term, but was dropped from the ticket for the 1944 election. He later became secretary of commerce under FDR. Roosevelt died during his fourth term and Vice President Harry S. Truman succeeded to the presidency. He further resented Truman after the President fired Wallace, who had been appointed as Secretary of Commerce, from his cabinet in 1946. In a speech, Wallace had broken with administration policy and became a public advocate for peaceful coexistence with the Soviet Union. Truman was unpopular in 1947, and some polls from the end of that year showed that Wallace had the support of more than 20% of the voters. Wallace started a left-wing independent candidacy under the name of the Progressive Party, named after two previous parties who used the name for the 1912 election and the 1924 election. He was supported by the American Labor Party, the Progressive Citizens of America, and other progressive groups in Illinois and California. Wallace would announce his candidacy in December 1947. The formal launch of the Progressive party was held in Philadelphia the following July.

Vice Presidential running mate 
Wallace wanted a US Senator as his running mate, as he thought a Senator would add legitimacy and popular appeal to his fledgling party. After Florida Senator Claude Pepper declined Wallace's entreaties, Wallace approached Idaho Senator Glen H. Taylor about being his running mate.  Taylor, a first term Democratic Senator, shared Wallace's concerns about Truman, but was worried about his own career. A former country music singer, Taylor did not have a lucrative career to fall back on, and took his time considering Wallace's offer. Finally, Taylor accepted Wallace's offer, motivated by fears about rising Cold War tensions. In February 1948, Wallace announced that Senator Taylor had agreed to become his running mate.

The convention
By the time of the Convention, the Wallace campaign had already peaked. Wallace's criticism of the Marshall Plan and "red baiting", had left Wallace and his supporters open to the charge of being "fellow travellers" if not being outright communists, a charge that was, for some at least, quite true.

The convention began on July 23, 1948, at the Municipal Auditorium. Among the delegates were such past and future luminaries as H.L. Menken, Norman Mailer, Norman Thomas, Pete Seeger and George McGovern. There were also numerous FBI agents. The first item on the agenda was to formally name the party the Progressives. Wallace and Taylor were nominated by acclamation.

Wallace and Taylor accepted their nominations at the Shibe Park baseball stadium.

The platform 
The platform opposed the Cold War and emphasized foreign policy. They called for the end of the Marshall Plan, Truman Doctrine, and nuclear weapons. They promoted coexistence with the Soviets and support for Israel. In domestic policy, the party supported civil rights, worker's rights and women's rights.

Supporters 
Underrepresented groups such as women, blacks, Hispanics, Jews, and youth were very active in the Progressive movement. The Communist Party was another supporter of the Progressive party. Wallace accepted the Communist Party's endorsement, characterizing his philosophy as "progressive capitalism". Their endorsement brought damage to the life of the party which was now portrayed as a left-wing front.

Election Outcome 
 
Democratic President Harry S. Truman with running mate Alben Barkley defeated Republican candidate Governor Thomas E. Dewey and running mate Governor Earl Warren. Henry Wallace's Progressive Party received no electoral votes, but received 1,156,103 popular votes, coming in fourth place behind the States' Rights Democratic party, or the Dixiecrats.

References

Political conventions in Philadelphia
1948 conferences
1948 United States presidential election